In addition to the Motherwell F.C. first team, competing in the Scottish Premiership, the club also has a reserve team who play in the SPFL Reserve League as well as younger age group teams in their youth system. They fielded a reserve team in defunct competitions for many years.

Reserve Team
In the early 1950s, reserve teams were incorporated into the third tier of the senior Scottish Football League, with Motherwell 'A' taking part for six seasons of the arrangement.

Motherwell were an ever-present in the Scottish Premier Reserve League since its formation in the 1998–99 season. Initially starting as an Under-21 league, the reserve league was open to all age groups from season 2004–05.

The Motherwell reserve team withdrew their team from the 2009–10 season due to financial constraints and a lack of support from other clubs, leading to the competition's abandonment. Motherwell Reserves then played friendly matches.

In July 2018, it was reported that reserve leagues would be reintroduced in lieu of the development leagues that had been in place since 2009. The top tier of the new SPFL Reserve League featured 18 clubs, whilst a second-tier reserve League comprised nine clubs. Other than a minimum age of 16, no age restrictions applied to the leagues. At the end of its first season (2018–19) several clubs intimated that they would withdraw from the Reserve League to play a variety of challenge matches, but Motherwell were one of those who chose to remain.

Motherwell Reserves usually played their home matches at Dalziel Park, a sports facility outside Motherwell that is also the training ground of the first-team, but also used Forthbank Stadium in Stirling and Excelsior Stadium in Airdrie.

Under 20s Team

History
Until 1998, Motherwell competed in the youth competitions administered by the Scottish Football League. They then took part in the age group leagues run by the Scottish Premier League and the Scottish Professional Football League.

From 2015 onwards it is possible for the Well academy to participate in the UEFA Youth League by their under-18 side (previously under-17s) winning the prior season's league at that age group; however this has not yet been achieved.

The Scottish Youth Cup (which began in 1985) is administered separately, with Motherwell winning the competition for the first time in 2016.

For the 2016–17 edition of the Scottish Challenge Cup, under-20 teams of Premiership clubs were granted entry to compete against adult teams for the first time in the modern era. In the 2018–19 edition, with the age now changed to under-21s, Motherwell reached the quarter-final stage, the best performance by a 'colt' team up to that point, losing 2–1 to eventual winners Ross County.

Having played home games at Fir Park, Hannah Park (Shotts) and Creamery Park (Bathgate), their regular stadium is now Airdrie's Excelsior Stadium.

In 2015, former Motherwell captain Stephen Craigan coached the Under-20 side. In 2019, Maurice Ross was appointed coach.

Reserve Team

Academy
The club also operates the Motherwell Academy. The academy was formed in 2012, and consists of teams made up of players and coaches from Under-11 to Under-17 level. The youth teams train at a sports facility based within Braidhurst High School. From 2013 the director was former Motherwell captain Scott Leitch, later being replaced by Steven Hammell who also had the same role as a player until his retirement.

In 2017, the Motherwell academy was one of eight across the country designated 'elite' status on the introduction of Project Brave, an SFA initiative to concentrate the development of the best young players at a smaller number of clubs with high quality facilities and coaching than was previously the case.

Staff

Honours
Reserves
Scottish Reserve League
Winners: 1912–13
Runners-up: 1988–89, 1994–95, 2006–07
SPFL Reserve Cup
Runners-up: 2018–19
Scottish 2nd XI Cup
Winners: 1942–43, 1948–49, 1956–57
Scottish Reserve League Cup
Winners: 1987–88

Youths
Scottish Youth Cup
Winners: 2016
Runners-up: 1987
SPFL Development League
Runner-up (3): 2004–05, 2005–06, 2009–10

Notes

Former youth team players

 James McFadden
 David Clarkson
 Mark Reynolds
 Paul Quinn
 Stephen Pearson
 Steven Hammell
 Keith Lasley
 Shaun Fagan
 Lee McCulloch
 Jordan Halsman
 Adam Coakley
 Jamie Pollock
 Mark Archdeacon
 Paul Slane
 Brian Dempsie
 Steven Meechan
 Jamie Murphy
 Robert McHugh
 Ross Forbes
 William Kinniburgh
 Shaun Hutchinson
 Jonathan Page
 Steven Saunders
 Marc Fitzpatrick
 Steven Lawless
 Gary Smith
 Darren Smith
 Steven Hetherington
 Adam Asghar
 Josh Watt
 Lee Erwin
 Craig Moore
 Jack Leitch
 Dom Thomas
 Allan Campbell
 David Turnbull
 Jake Hastie
 James Scott

References

External links 
 Reserve Squad, Motherwell official website
 Academy, Motherwell official website
 SFA Youth Cup results and archive, Scottish Football Association website

Reserves
Youth football in Scotland
Scottish reserve football teams
Football academies in Scotland